The Balance Tour was a concert tour by American hard rock band Van Halen in support of their tenth studio album Balance.

Background
The tour was dubbed the "Ambulance" Tour by Eddie Van Halen due to his hip injury caused by avascular necrosis, and his brother, drummer Alex Van Halen wearing a neck brace for most of the tour, due to rupturing three vertebrae in his neck. Consequently, Eddie was a lot more static on stage. This would be the group's last tour with Sammy Hagar on vocals until 2004. The opening night in Pensacola, and a combination of footage from the two Toronto shows were broadcast on Pay-Per-View.

The band had not performed any shows as an opening act in over a decade, but on this tour they opened for veteran act Bon Jovi for several sold-out dates at stadiums due to Bon Jovi's huge appeal overseas. Collective Soul, Skid Row, Our Lady Peace, and Brother Cane opened for Van Halen on the North American legs of the tour.

Reception
Joe Ehrbar, a correspondent from the Spokesman Review, gave the performance he attended at The Gorge a positive review. He opened his review, talking about the state of the band with their injuries, suggesting that it be renamed "Van Handicapped", adding that Alex Van Halen didn't seem so enthusiastic about performing that night. After acknowledging the state of the band, he noted that the band gave an amazing performance with youthful energy and a steady stream of their hit songs, with the show getting better and more climactic. While he stated that the band was notorious over the years for delivering sloppy concerts, they had performed impeccably tight that night.

Setlists

North America
"Right Now"
"Big Fat Money"
"Why Can't This Be Love"
"Top Of The World"
"Not Enough"
"Bass Solo"
"The Seventh Seal"
"Amsterdam"
"Mine All Mine"
"Drum solo"
"Can't Stop Loving You"
"Feelin"
"I Can't Drive 55"
"Eagles Fly"
"Ain't Talkin Bout Love"
"Guitar Solo"
"You Really Got Me"
"Jump"
"There's Only One Way To Rock"
"Dreams"
"Don't Tell Me (What Love Can Do)"
"Panama"

Europe
"The Seventh Seal"
"Runaround"
"Best Of Both Worlds"
"Ain't Talkin Bout Love"
"When It's Love"
"Panama"
"Feelin"
"Guitar Solo"
"You Really Got Me"
"Dreams"
"Why Can't This Be Love"
"There's Only One Way To Rock"
"Jump"
"Right Now"

Tour dates

 The band opened for Bon Jovi at these shows.

Box office score data

Personnel
 Eddie Van Halen – guitar, backing vocals
 Michael Anthony – bass, backing vocals, keyboards
 Alex Van Halen – drums
 Sammy Hagar – lead vocals, guitar

Additional musician
 Alan Fitzgerald – keyboards

References

Van Halen concert tours
1995 concert tours